Munsiyari (Kumaoni: Munsyār) is the name of the sub-division headquarters, a conglomeration of revenue villages and it also refers to the entire region as Munsiyari Tehsil and Sub Division in the Pithoragarh District in the hill-state of Uttarakhand, India.

Establishment 
During a summer festival organized in Munsiyari market in 2013, a proposal for granting Munsiyari the status of Nagar Panchayat (lower level Municipality) was passed by the locals. Gram Panchayats attached to the Munsiyari market had also given their consent for this. On 28 February 2014, the Uttarakhand Cabinet decided to grant Nagar Panchayat status to the towns of Munsiyari, Chaukhutia and Naugaon. Shortly afterwards, the then Chief Minister Harish Rawat made an announcement confirming this move while on a visit to the town. The municipal area was to be created by incorporating 5 Gram Panchayats: Mallaghorpatta, Tallaghorpatta, Bunga, Sarmoli and Jainti. An official notification was issued on 7 October 2014, but due to major opposition by the Gram Sabhas, the Nagar Panchayat could not come into existence. In June 2015, several government officials visited the area and tried to initiate talks with local villagers. After all the talks failed, the notification that allowed the formation of Nagar Panchayat was revoked on 22 August 2016.

Overview 
In local parlance, the name 'Munsiyari' refers to a 'place with snow'. Situated on the banks of Goriganga river, it is a fast-growing tourist destination, and mountaineers, glacier enthusiasts, high altitude trekkers and nature lovers commonly use it as their hub or base camp. Munsiyari also falls on the ancient salt route from Tibet and is at the entrance of the Johar Valley, which extends along the path of the Gori Ganga river to its source at the Milam Glacier. It is inhabited mainly by people of a few different caste groups including the Shauka tribe, dalits or Scheduled Castes and people categorized in other general castes comprising Kshatriya's, Pandits with a few Sikhs, Christians and Buddhists.

Munsiyari bazaar is a conglomeration of revenue villages and is not categorized as a town. The bazaar area comprises the villages of Malla Ghorpatta and Bunga, while Naya Basti, Sarmoli, Nana Sem, Jainti, Papdi villages form the periphery of the area popularly called Munsiyari. The main bazaar area faces east towards the Himalayan Panchachuli ranges.

The upper part of Munsiyari is called Malla Johar, which comprises 14 trans-humant alpine villages, that are seasonally occupied during the months of May to early November.

Economy 
Principally subsistence based agriculture and animal husbandry and allied activities.  Many families are dependent on forests and natural resources for their livelihoods.

Natural history

Birds 
A part of the administrative region of Munsiari is located in the Gori river basin. As of May 2014 a total of 319 birds have been recorded, constituting a quarter of India's birds. Species richness apart, the Gori river basin harbours many rare, endemic, globally threatened and endangered bird species, including many of the evolutionarily older birds on the Indian sub-continent. The region has been designated by Birdlife International as an Important Bird Area.

Lichen Park 
The Uttarakhand Forest Department has developed a lichen park in Munsiari, which is spread across 1.5 acres. It is India's first lichen park and its development started in 2019.

Gallery

See also 
 Panchchuli - glacier and mountain
 Gori Ganga River

References

External links 

 
 Driving guide to Munsyari
 Natural History Information on Birds from Himal Prakriti

Cities and towns in Pithoragarh district
Hill stations in Uttarakhand
Tourism in Uttarakhand